Showtime! is the third and final live album by American rock band The J. Geils Band during their career. It was recorded at the Pine Knob Music Theater in Clarkston, Michigan on September 4, 1982. While some critics consider it to be weaker than the group's two earlier live albums "Live" Full House (1972) and Blow Your Face Out (1976), this release captures the band at its commercial peak. The tracks are drawn primarily from the four studio albums released since Blow Your Face Out:  Monkey Island (1977); Sanctuary (1978); Love Stinks (1980); and Freeze Frame (1981). This was the last release by the band before frontman Peter Wolf's departure in 1983.

Track listing
All songs written by Seth Justman and Peter Wolf, except where noted.

"Jus' Can't Stop Me" (from Sanctuary) – 3:44
"Just Can't Wait" (from Love Stinks) – 3:27
"Till the Walls Come Tumblin' Down" (from Love Stinks) – 3:31
"Sanctuary" (from Sanctuary) – 3:49
"I'm Falling" (from Monkey Island) – 6:01
"Love Rap" – 5:14
"Love Stinks" (from) Love Stinks) – 3:28
"Stoop Down #39" (from Nightmares...and Other Tales from the Vinyl Jungle) – 5:56
"I Do (from) Monkey Island)" (Melvin Mason, Johnny Paden, Frank Paden, Jesse Smith, Willie Stephenson) – 3:04
"Centerfold" (from) Freeze Frame)  (Justman) – 4:03
"Land of a Thousand Dances" (Chris Kenner) – 5:41

Note: on the LP version of the album, the cross-fade between "Love Rap" and "Love Stinks" is divided with an abrupt ending of "Love Rap" at the end of Side 1, and continuing with "Love Stinks" at the beginning of Side 2.

Personnel
Stephen Jo Bladd – drums
Magic Dick – harmonica
J. Geils – guitar
Seth Justman – keyboards, backing vocals
Danny Klein – bass
Peter Wolf – lead vocals
The Uptown Horns - Crispin Cioe (saxophone), Arno Hecht (tenor saxophone), Paul “Hollywood” Litteral (trumpet)

Production
Producer: Seth Justman
Engineers: David Brown, Phil Gitomer, David Hewitt, Jon Mathias, Kooster McAllister, Frank Pavlich
Mixing assistant: Steve Marcantonio
Mastering: Joe Brescio
Live sound engineer: Frank Pavlich
Lighting: Dave Berndt
Arranger: Seth Justman
Art direction: Carin Goldberg
Design: Carin Goldberg
Illustrations: Leslie Cabarga
Lettering: Leslie Cabarga
Liner notes: John Tobler

Charts
Album

Singles

References

The J. Geils Band albums
1982 live albums
EMI Records live albums
1982 in Michigan